Prey Svay is a khum (commune) of Moung Ruessei District in Battambang Province in north-western Cambodia.

Villages

 Kor
 Cham Ro'a
 Thnal Bambaek
 Rumchek
 Tuol Thnong
 Tuol Skor
 Kalaom Phluk
 Srama Meas
 Svay Jrum
 Prey Svay
 Prey Preal

References

Communes of Battambang province
Moung Ruessei District